Malcolm Besley is an Australian record producer, songwriter and mix engineer. He is known for his work with Northeast Party House, Slowly Slowly, Client Liaison and Shouse.

Career 
Malcolm learned piano from a young age and briefly sang for the Australian Boys Choir before quitting music all together, until his late teens where frustrated with the high school orchestral system he formed various punk and metal bands with school friends. After finishing High School Malcolm went on to study for cinema and media in an arts degree at La Trobe University, he dropped out mid second year and went on to earn an advanced diploma of Music Production at Box Hill TAFE.  Malcolm began working as the in-house assistant at The Base Studios South Melbourne under the producer Forrester Savell

Discography

References

General references
https://www.abc.net.au/triplejunearthed/artist/commoner/
https://cityhubsydney.com.au/tag/malcolm-besley/
https://www.thegov.com.au/index.php/gig_guide/gig/e64515
https://themusic.com.au/streams/single-premiere-viera-motel-take-heart/aEhwen18f34/03-07-19/

Living people
Date of birth missing (living people)
Australian record producers
Australian songwriters
Australian audio engineers
Year of birth missing (living people)